Réginald Storms (13 September 1880 – 24 February 1948) was a Belgian sport shooter who competed at the 1908 Summer Olympics.

References

External links

1880 births
1948 deaths
Belgian male sport shooters
ISSF pistol shooters
Olympic shooters of Belgium
Shooters at the 1908 Summer Olympics
Olympic silver medalists for Belgium
Olympic medalists in shooting
Medalists at the 1908 Summer Olympics
Belgian male tennis players
20th-century Belgian people